Alberteae is a tribe of flowering plants in the family Rubiaceae and contains about 18 species in 3 genera. Its representatives are found in tropical and southern Africa and in Madagascar.

Genera 
Currently accepted names
 Alberta E.Mey. (1 sp)
 Aulacocalyx Hook.f. (12 sp)
 Razafimandimbisonia Kainul. & B.Bremer (5 sp)

Synonyms
 Dorothea Wernham = Aulacocalyx
 Ernestimeyera Kuntze = Alberta

References 

 
Ixoroideae tribes